Hamza ibn al-Hasan [ibn] al-Mu'addib al-Isfahani (– after 961), commonly known as Hamza al-Isfahani (or Hamza Isfahani) was a Persian philologist and historian, who wrote in Arabic during the Buyid era. A Persian nationalist with strong prejudices against Arabs, he spent most of his life in his native town, Isfahan, and visited Baghdad three times during his lifetime. He had contact with many important scholars and historians, among them al-Tabari and Ibn Durayd. He wrote a history of Isfahan, a famous Chronology of pre-Islamic and Islamic dynasties known as Taʾrīk̲h̲ sinī mulūk al-arḍ wa ’l-anbiyāʾ, and some other works on lexicography and poetry.

Biography 
Like many other medieval Iranian scholars, details regarding the life of Hamza are obscure. The city had served as an important center in western Iran under the Achaemenid, Parthian and Sasanian Empire. During the 9th-century, many Zoroastrians and other adherants of non-Zoroastrian, Iranian faiths continued to reside in the city. During the late 9th-century or early 10th-century, the city started to gain a large Muslim community, which, nevertheless, preserved their ancient lore. The faith of Hamza is uncertain; his use of honorifics to refer to the Islamic prophet Muhammad indicates that he was Muslim, or that he perhaps did not want to be open about his Zoroastrian beliefs. He probably somewhat believed in Zoroastrianism, as demonstrated by his interest in its traditions and acceptance of its outlook.

Despite his keen interest in Iranian affairs and the pre-Islamic history of the country, Hamza preferred to write in Arabic, like the rest of the literary elite of Isfahan. The city seemingly served as a major hub for the collection and transmission of the numerous modifications of the Middle Persian history text Khwaday-Namag (Book of Kings). Hamza made much use of the work, as demonstrated in his Sini Muluk al-ard w'al-anbiya. Not many scholars in Isfahan were familiar with Middle Persian, and it is uncertain if Hamza himself had any knowledge of it. Hamza was seemingly a distinguished citizen of Isfahan, due to his broad knowledge, which also earned him opponents, who referred him to as "drivel merchant." In his work, Hamza immediately puts emphasis on the importance of Iran as centre of the world. His approach to this would have been acceptable in the Sasanian era, or even prior. Hamza is considered the spiritual successor of the 9th-century Persian historian Abu Hanifa Dinawari (died 896).

Notes

References

Sources 
 
 
 
 
 
 

10th-century Iranian historians
10th-century Arabic writers
890s births
Year of death unknown
Historians under the Buyid dynasty
Shu'ubiyya
Writers from Isfahan
Iranian Arabic-language writers